Ana Lúcia Alves de Menezes (22 January 1975 – 20 April 2021), also known as Ana Lúcia Granjeiro, was a Brazilian voice actress and voice director. Some of her notable dubbing roles included Sam Puckett in iCarly, Suzy Sheep in Peppa Pig, Laura in the Mexican telenovela Carrusel, Rory Gilmore in Gilmore Girls, and Maite Perroni in various roles.

She was nominated three times for the Yamato Award: best actress in 2004 for Chihiro Ogino in Spirited Away, best supporting actress in 2005 for Koto in Yu Yu Hakusho, and best actress in 2010 for Misa Amane in Death Note, which she won.

Personal life and death
Ana Lúcia also practiced taekwondo, competing in tournaments at the International Taekwon-Do Federation. She won a bronze medal in the 1997 World Cup.

Menezes died from a stroke in Rio de Janeiro on 20 April 2021. According to doctors, the stroke was caused by cerebral thrombosis which doctors believe may have been caused by a reinfection of COVID-19 that she had at the end of 2020. She is survived by her daughter, voice actress Bia Menezes.

Dubbing
Amy Rose in Sonic X and Sonic Boom
Aria Montgomery in Pretty Little Liars
Sam Puckett in iCarly and Sam & Cat
Koto in Yu Yu Hakusho
Dulce Maria in Carita de ángel
Po in Teletubbies
Tanya Sloan in Power Rangers Zeo and Power Rangers Turbo
Kira Ford in Power Rangers Dino Thunder
Vida Rocca in Power Rangers Mystic Force
Vada in My Girl
Stella in Winx Club
Maite Perroni in Rebelde, RBD: La familia, Cuidado con el ángel, Mi pecado, The Stray Cat y Triunfo del amor
Sophie Sheridan in Mamma Mia! and Mamma Mia! Here We Go Again
Toph Beifong in Avatar: The Last Airbender
Hilda in Hilda (TV series)
Poof and Trixie Tang in The Fairly OddParents
Jasmine Fenton in Danny Phantom
Chihiro Ogino in Spirited Away
Bridgette in Total Drama and Total DramaRama
Kaori Saki (Diego) and Yuka Komastu (Mariam) in Beyblade
Misa Amane in Death Note
Ikon Eron in Gormiti

Awards and nominations

Notes

References

External links

1975 births
2021 deaths
Brazilian voice actresses
Brazilian voice directors
Actresses from Recife
21st-century Brazilian actresses